The Prince of Wales's Leinster Regiment (Royal Canadians) was an infantry regiment of the line in the British Army, formed in 1881 by the amalgamation of the 100th (Prince of Wales's Royal Canadian) Regiment of Foot and the 109th Regiment of Foot (Bombay Infantry). The 100th Foot was first raised in 1858 and the 109th was first raised in 1853. Between the time of its formation and Irish independence, it was one of eight Irish regiments raised largely in Ireland, with its Birr Barracks home depot in Birr. It was disbanded with the Partition of Ireland following establishment of the independent Irish Free State in 1922 when the five regiments that had their traditional recruiting grounds in the counties of the new state were disbanded.

History

19th century

The regiment was formed in 1881 by the amalgamation of the 100th (Prince of Wales's Royal Canadian) Regiment of Foot and the 109th Regiment of Foot (Bombay Infantry). The amalgamation of the two regiments into one with the title Prince of Wales's Leinster Regiment (Royal Canadians), was part of the United Kingdom government's reorganization of the British Army under the Childers Reforms, a continuation of the Cardwell Reforms implemented in 1879.

It was one of eight Irish regiments raised largely in Ireland, with its home depot at Birr Barracks in Birr. The regiment recruited mainly in the province of Leinster. Militarily, the whole of Ireland was administered as a separate command within the United Kingdom with Command Headquarters at Parkgate (Phoenix Park) in Dublin, directly under the War Office in London.

The 1st Battalion, which had been in India, moved to Ireland in 1894. A detachment took part in the Fourth Anglo-Ashanti War in 1895, but the rest of the battalion remained in Ireland until moving to Halifax, Canada, in 1898. The 2nd Battalion moved to Ireland in 1882 and to England in 1888. It transferred to Malta in 1894, and joined the Bermuda Garrison the following year. In 1897, it moved to Halifax, and in 1898 to the West Indies.

Second Boer War
Both regular battalions were deployed to South Africa for the Second Boer War. The 1st Battalion saw action around Bethlehem on April 1902 when 14 men were wounded while the 2nd Battalion held the Heilbron branch line in February 1902 when they had 10 casualties. The 1st battalion stayed until the end of the war, following which 370 officers and men left Cape Town on the SS Englishman in late September 1902, and arrived at Southampton in late October, when they were posted to Fermoy.

In 1908, the Volunteers and Militia were reorganised nationally, with the former becoming the Territorial Force and the latter the Special Reserve; the regiment now had three Reserve but no Territorial battalions.

First World War

Regular army
The 1st Battalion, which had been at Faizabad in India, landed at Le Havre as part of the 82nd Brigade in the 27th Division in December 1914 for service on the Western Front but moved to Salonika in December 1915 and then moved to Egypt for service in Palestine in September 1917. The 2nd Battalion landed at Saint-Nazaire as part of the 17th Brigade in the 6th Division in September 1914 for service on the Western Front.

New Armies
The 6th (Service) Battalion landed at Anzac Cove as part of the 29th Brigade in the 10th (Irish) Division in August 1915 but moved to Salonika in September 1915 and on to Egypt for service in Palestine in September 1917 before landing at Marseille in June 1918 for service on the Western Front. The 7th Battalion landed at Le Havre as part of the 47th Brigade in the 16th (Irish) Division in December 1915 for service on the Western Front.

Disbandment

Due to substantial defence cuts and the establishment of the Irish Free State in 1922, it was agreed that the six former Southern Ireland regiments would be disbanded, including the Prince of Wales's Leinster Regiment (Royal Canadians). On 12 June, five regimental colours were laid up in a ceremony at St George's Hall, Windsor Castle in the presence of HM King George V. The six regiments were then all disbanded on 31 July 1922. With the simultaneous outbreak of the Irish Civil War conflict some thousands of their ex-servicemen and officers contributed to expanding the Free State government's newly formed National Army. They brought considerable combat experience with them and by May 1923 comprised 50 per cent of its 53,000 soldiers and 20 per cent of its officers. Serving personnel of the Prince of Wales's Leinster Regiment were given the option of transferring to other units if they wished to continue to serve in the British Army.

In recognition of their Canadian roots, the officers of the 1st Battalion decided to give their officers' mess silver 'in trust' to the Government of Canada "as a token of the regard for the Great Dominion which gave birth to the Battalion to be held in trust until such time as the Battalion is again raised". The silver, known as "The Leinster Plate", was deposited for safe keeping at the Royal Military College of Canada in 1923 at the suggestion of Edward Mortimer Macdonald and James MacBrien,  Canada's Minister of National Defence and Chief of Staff respectively. The silver is on display at Royal Military College of Canada in the Senior Staff Mess and Museum (Fort Frederic).

In 2013 the Regimental Association erected a memorial to commemorate the regiment's strong linkages with the Birr area, particularly to Birr Barracks.

Battle honours

The regiment's battle honours were as follows:
From 100th Regiment of Foot: Niagara
From 109th Regiment of Foot: Central India
Second Boer War: South Africa 1900–02
The Great War:

Victoria Cross recipients
Lieutenant John Vincent Holland, Great War
Corporal John Cunningham, Great War
Private Martin Joseph Moffat, Great War
Sergeant John O'Neill, Great War

Colonel-in-chief
 1919–:	F.M. HM King Edward VIII

Regimental colonels

Colonels of the regiment were:
1881–1890 (1st Battalion): Gen. Sir Alexander Gordon, KCB (ex 100th Foot)
1881–1889 (2nd Battalion): Gen. Sir Richard Denis Kelly, KCB (ex 109th Foot)
1890–1891: Gen. Henry Meade Hamilton, CB
1891–1894: Gen. Sir Patrick Leonard MacDougall, KCMG
1894–1910: Lt-Gen. Alastair McIan Macdonald
1910–1919: Maj-Gen. George Upton Prior
1919–1922: Maj-Gen. Sir Gerald Farrell Boyd, KCB, CMG, DSO, DCM
1922: Regiment disbanded

Notes

References

External links

 Includes chronological index of titles.

The Canadian Origins and Associations of The 100th (Prince of Wales's Royal Canadian) Regiment of Foot and The Prince of Wales's Leinster Regiment (Royal Canadians)
Historical sketch of the 100th Prince of Wales Royal Canadian Regiment
THE LEINSTER REGIMENT

Defunct Irish regiments of the British Army
Infantry regiments of the British Army
Military history of Canada
Military units and formations established in 1881
Ireland in World War I
Military units and formations disestablished in 1922
Regiments of the British Army in World War I
Leinster
1881 establishments in the United Kingdom
1922 disestablishments in the United Kingdom